Fet is a municipality in Viken county, Norway.

Fet, Fett or FET may also refer to:

People
 Abram Ilyich Fet (1924–2007), Russian mathematician
 Afanasy Fet (1820–1892), Russian poet
 George Fett (1920–1989), American cartoonist
 Harry Fett (1875–1962), Norwegian art historian and industrialist
 Jana Fett (born 1996), Croatian tennis player
 Sondre Brunstad Fet (born 1997), Norwegian footballer

Fictional characters
 Boba Fett, a Star Wars character
 Cassus Fett, a Star Wars character
 Jango Fett, a Star Wars character

Science and technology 
 Fet (crater), on Mercury
 Field-effect transistor
 Flash emulation tool, a device for emulating a flash memory
 Forum Energy Technologies, an American oilfield products company
 FET protein family
 FET (timetabling software)
 FET, a Mazda F engine

Acronyms 
 Falange Española Tradicionalista y de las Juntas de Ofensiva Nacional Sindicalista, the political party of Francoist Spain
 FarEasTone, a telecommunications company based in Taiwan
 Female Engagement Team, a group of female military personnel which undertakes gender-suited tasks
 Functional Ensemble of Temperament
 Further-eastern European Time

Other uses 
 Fett (magazine), a Norwegian feminist magazine
 Fet Church (Luster), Sogn og Fjordane county, Norway
 FET, IATA airport code and FAA location identifier for Fremont Municipal Airport (Nebraska), United States
 FET, airline code for Old Dominion Freight Lines - see List of airline codes

See also 
 Phet (disambiguation)
 Fête